Louis Luyten (born 19 May 1955) is a Belgian former professional racing cyclist. He rode in four editions of the Tour de France.

References

External links

1955 births
Living people
Belgian male cyclists
Cyclists from Limburg (Belgium)
People from Bree, Belgium